The deep branch runs obliquely upward upon the tendon of the obturator externus and in front of the quadratus femoris toward the trochanteric fossa, where it anastomoses with twigs from the superior gluteal artery and inferior gluteal artery.

References 

Arteries of the lower limb